Hakea oleifolia, commonly known as dungyn, or the olive-leaved hakea, is a shrub or tree of the family Proteacea  and is endemic to an area along the south coast in the South West and Great Southern regions of Western Australia.

Description
It blooms from August to October and produces strong sweetly scented white large flowers on short racemes in leaf axils. Up to 28 showy flowers may appear per raceme.

Taxonomy and naming
Hakea oleifolia  was first formally described by Carl Meisner in 1856 and the description published in Transactions of the Linnean Society. Named from the genus Olea- olive and from the Latin folium - a leaf, referring to the resemblance of the leaf to that of the olive tree.

Distribution and habitat
Olive-leaved hakea grows in the wet south-western tip of Western Australia from Busselton to Bremer Bay. An understorey plant growing in woodland and coastal locations withstanding salt-laden 
winds on clay, sand, loam and gravelly soils.  A frost-tolerant species requiring a well-drained site.

Conservation status
Hakea oleifolia is classified as "not threatened" by the Western Australian Government.

References

oleifolia
Eudicots of Western Australia
Plants described in 1856
Taxa named by Robert Brown (botanist, born 1773)